Table tennis has been competed in the Southeast Asian Games since the inaugural edition when the Games was titled the South East Asian Peninsular Games in 1959 Bangkok, Thailand.

Editions

Events

SEAP Games(1959-75) & SEA Games(1977-99)

SEA Games(2001 - Present)

Medal table

SEA Games (1995 - Present)

See also
Table tennis at the Summer Olympics
Table tennis at the Asian Games
South East Asian Table Tennis Championships

References